The Early Childhood Education Journal analyzes issues, trends, policies, and practices for early childhood education from birth through age eight.

Abstracted/Indexed in 

Academic Search, Cabell's, Contents Pages in Education, CSA/Proquest, Current Abstracts, Educational Management Abstracts, Educational Research Abstracts Online (ERA), Educational Technology Abstracts, ERIC System Database, ERIH, Gale, Google Scholar, HW Wilson, MathEDUC, Mathematics Education, Multicultural Education Abstracts, OCLC, OmniFile, PsycINFO, SCOPUS, Sociology of Education Abstracts, Special Education Needs Abstracts, Studies on Women & Gender Abstracts, Summon by Serial Solutions, Technical Education & Training Abstracts, TOC Premier

See also 
 The National Association for the Education of Young Children
 Child Care & Early Education Research

References

External links 
 Journal Homepage Official page at Springer Science Business Media
 National Institute for Early Education Research
 EARLI sig5: Learning and Development in Early Childhood

Education journals
Springer Science+Business Media academic journals
Publications established in 1973
English-language journals
Early childhood education materials
Bimonthly journals